The Mansfield Cheatham House is a historic mansion in Springfield, Tennessee, U.S..

History
The house was built for Richard Cheatham and his wife, Susan Sanders, circa 1833. It was inherited by their son, Edward Saunders Cheatham. After he died, it was inherited by his brother, Richard Boone Cheatham. In 1878, it was purchased by Cornelia Benton. A decade later, in 1888, it was purchased by Professor J. W. Huey. It served as a public school until it was purchased by W. H. Simmons.

It has been listed on the National Register of Historic Places since January 30, 1978.

References

Houses on the National Register of Historic Places in Tennessee
National Register of Historic Places in Robertson County, Tennessee
Houses completed in 1833
Robertson County, Tennessee
Cheatham family